Ferdinand Lassalle (11 April 1825 – 31 August 1864) was a Prussian-German jurist, philosopher, socialist and political activist best remembered as the initiator of the social democratic movement in Germany. "Lassalle was the first man in Germany, the first in Europe, who succeeded in organising a party of socialist action", or, as Rosa Luxemburg put it: "Lassalle managed to wrestle from history in two years of flaming agitation what needed many decades to come about." As agitator he coined the terms night-watchman state and iron law of wages.

Biography

Early life 
Lassalle was born Ferdinand Johann Gottlieb Lassal on 11 April 1825 in Breslau, Silesia (now Wrocław, Poland). His father Heyman Lassal was a Jewish silk merchant and intended his son for a business career, sending him to the commercial school at Leipzig. However, Lassalle soon transferred to university, studying first in the University of Breslau and later at the University of Berlin. There, Lassalle studied philology and philosophy and became a devotee of the philosophical system of Georg Hegel. Lassalle changed his name at a young age to disassociate himself from Judaism.

Lassalle passed his university examinations with distinction in 1845 and thereafter traveled to Paris to write a book on Heraclitus. There, Lassalle met the poet Heinrich Heine, who wrote of his intense young friend in 1846: "I have found in no one so much passion and clearness of intellect united in action. You have good right to be audacious – we others only usurp this divine right, this heavenly privilege".

Back in Berlin to work on his book, Lassalle met Countess Sophie von Hatzfeldt, a woman in her early 40s who had been separated from her husband of many years and who had an ongoing dispute with him regarding the disposition of the couple's property. Lassalle volunteered himself to her cause and the offer was readily accepted. Lassalle first challenged her husband to a duel, but his challenge was rejected.

An eight-year legal battle followed in which Lassalle defended Countess von Hatzfeldt's interests in 36 different courtrooms. Ultimately, a settlement was made in her favor, bringing her a substantial fortune. In her gratitude, she agreed to pay Lassalle an annual income of 5,000 thalers (about £750) for the rest of his life.

1848 Revolution and its aftermath 
Lassalle was a committed socialist from an early age. During the German Revolutions of 1848, he spoke at public meetings in favor of the revolutionary-democratic cause and urged the citizens of Düsseldorf to prepare themselves for armed resistance in advance of the violence that was expected after the decision of the Prussian government to dissolve the National Assembly. Lassalle was subsequently arrested for his involvement in this activity and he was charged with inciting armed opposition to the state.

Although Lassalle was acquitted of this serious charge, he was kept in prison until he could be tried on a lesser charge of inciting resistance against public officials. He was convicted of this lesser charge and the 23-year-old Lassalle served a sentence of six months in prison.

Banned from residence in Berlin in the aftermath of his conviction, Lassalle moved to the Rhineland, where he continued to pursue the lawsuit of the Countess von Hatzfeldt (settled in 1854) and finished his work on the philosophy of Heraclitus, (completed in 1857 and published in two volumes the following year). Reaction to the book was mixed as some declared the work seminal while others, including Karl Marx, considered it a mere recitation of Hegelian axioms. However, even the book's detractors had to admire the scope of the work and the publication gave Lassalle lasting status among German intellectuals.

During this period, Lassalle was not politically active, although he remained interested in labor affairs. He left his legal practice and philosophy in favor of drama, authoring a play called Franz von Sickingen, a Historical Tragedy. Sent anonymously to the Royal Theatre, the play was rejected by a manager, causing Lassalle to publish it under his own name in 1859. The work was characterized by Edward Bernstein, an early and sympathetic biographer, as awkward and prone to excessive oratory, unsuited for the stage despite several effective scenes.

Lassalle wanted to live in Berlin and despite the ban in 1859 made his return disguised as a wagon driver. Lassalle appealed to his friend, the aging scholar Alexander von Humboldt, to intercede on his behalf before the king to rescind the ban and allow his return. The appeal was successful and Lassalle was again officially allowed to live in the Prussian capital.

Lassalle avoided revolutionary activity for several years thereafter. He became a political commentator and wrote a short book on the war in Italy in which he warned Prussia against rushing to the aid of the Austrian Empire in its war with France. Lassalle followed this with a larger work on legal theory, published in two volumes in 1861 as Das System der erworbenen Rechte (The System of Acquired Rights). According to Bernstein, Lassalle wanted the book "to establish a legal and scientific principle which shall once for all determine under what circumstances, and how far laws may be retroactive without violating the idea of right itself"; that is, determining the circumstances under which laws may be made retroactive when they come into conflict with previously established laws.

Political activism 

Only briefly engaged in the revolutionary struggle during 1848, Lassalle reentered public politics in 1862, motivated by a constitutional struggle in Prussia. King Wilhelm I, who became king on 2 January 1861, had repeatedly clashed with the liberal Chamber of Deputies, resulting in multiple dissolutions of the Diet. As a recognized legal scholar, Lassalle was asked to make public addresses dealing with the nature of the constitution and its relationship to the social forces within society.

Lassalle replied by giving a speech wherein he set out that constitutional matters are merely questions of power. The liberal press was enraged by his speech. Lassalle reacted by holding the same lecture twice again.

In another speech, delivered in Berlin on 12 April 1862, later known as the Workers' Program, Lassalle assigned moral primacy in society to the working class over the bourgeosie, an assertion regarded as dangerous by the Prussian censorship. The entire print run of 3,000 copies of the pamphlet of Lassalle's speech was seized by the authorities, who issued a legal charge against Lassalle for allegedly endangering the public peace.

Lassalle was brought to trial to answer this accusation in Berlin on 16 January 1863. Lawsuits would continue to interfere with his political activity for the rest of his life. After a widely publicized trial at which he presented his own defense, Lassalle was convicted of the charges levied against him, sentenced to four months' imprisonment and assessed the costs of the trial. This term was later replaced by a fine upon appeal.

Foundation of the socialist party 
On 22 October 1862, a few worker delegates that had visited London that had come back with left-wing ideas, published an open letter about the political and economic situation of the working class. Lassalle was delighted to find workers whose ideas went even further than the socialist statements which he made in public, and replied with his own open letter in which he called for a workers party, independent of the liberal German Progress Party.

By arguing that the working class had nothing to gain from the liberal party, he was in a state of war with the liberal party and newspapers for the next months until his death. Lassalle soon began a new career as a political agitator, traveling around Germany, giving speeches and writing pamphlets in an attempt to organise and rouse the working class. As he tried to make the working class break with the liberals, this would eventually lead to an alliance with the reactionary Prince Bismarck.

In 1864, Lassalle made several secret appeals to Bismarck, later the main proponent of the Anti-Socialist Laws, in favor of the immediate implementation of progressive policies such as universal suffrage. He also asked for the protection of his own publications from police seizure. Lassalle attempted to make common cause with the conservative Bismarck in his book Herr Basitat-Schulze, declaring that he "must inform Your Excellency that this work will bring about the utter destruction of Liberals and the whole Progressive bourgeoisie". Lassalle asked Bismarck to exert his influence at the Ministry of Justice to prevent the seizure of the book. The book subsequently appeared without police interference, but Bismarck, occupied with other matters, refused a request by Lassalle for another meeting and no further direct contacts between the pair were made.

Élie Halévy would later write on this situation:

The only stated purpose of the party was the winning of equal, universal and direct suffrage by peaceful and legal means.

Personality 
Lassalle was remembered by biographers as a contradictory personality, earnestly committed to the benefit of the masses, but driven by personal ambition and possessing extreme vanity. Indeed, one early biographer declared:

Bertrand Russell said about Lassalle: "No one has ever understood the power of agitation and organisation better than Lassalle … The secret of his influence lay in his overpowering and imperious will, in his impatience of the passive endurance of evil, and in his absolute confidence in his own power. His whole character is that of an epicurean god, unwittingly become man, awakening suddenly to the existence of evil, and finding with amazement that his will is not omnipotent to set it right."

Death and legacy 

In Rigi Kaltbad, Lassalle met a young woman named Helene von Dönniges and during the summer of 1864 they decided to marry. She was the daughter of a Protestant family then living in Geneva, who wanted nothing to do with Lassalle. The father, a historian, prevented Helene from seeing him and Lassalle protested vehemently. Apparently under duress, she soon renounced Lassalle in favour of another suitor, a Wallachian prince named Iancu Racoviță, to whom she had previously been betrothed.

Lassalle sent dueling challenges both to Helene's father von Dönniges and to Racoviță, who accepted. Lassalle had no experience in the use of pistols and only one day to exercise. At the Carouge, a suburb of Geneva, a duel was held on the morning of 28 August. Lassalle was shot in the abdomen by Racoviță and died three days later on 31 August 1864. Following the duel Racoviţă fell ill and died not long after Helene von Dönniges married him.

At the time of his death, Lassalle's political party had 4,610 members and no detailed political program. The ADAV continued after his death, going on to help establish the Social Democratic Party of Germany in 1875.

Ferdinand Lassalle is buried in Breslau (now Wrocław, Poland), in the Old Jewish Cemetery.

Political relations

Relations with Marx 
Lassalle and Marx became friends during the Revolutions of 1848. When the protests were crushed, Lassalle was imprisoned and Marx fled Germany. They continued correspondence through letters, and would not meet again until 1861. In the meantime Marx grew to distrust Lassalle under influence of Engels, who had never much sympathy for him. Marx often responded to Lassalle's warm letters by mirroring this tone, but in his letters to Engels he expressed antipathy towards Lassalle, including calling him "the Jewish nigger Lassalle". Lassalle continued to believe that their friendship was genuine until at least 1862. Franz Mehring called Marx's "attitude to Lassalle [...] the most difficult psychological problem his life offers".

The difference in character between the two men presented itself in a clear manner when they had to defend themselves for their support of 1848 revolutions, in front of a jury:Also on theoretical and political matters, their opinions diverged. Indeed, Marx's essay Critique of the Gotha Program is written in part as a reaction to Lassalle's ideas within the socialist party of Germany. Lassalle was a German patriot, and supported Prussia in its quest for German unification. In February 1864, Lassalle wrote to Engels that despite being a republican since infancy, "I have come to the conviction that nothing could have a greater future or a more beneficent role than the monarchy, if it could only make up its mind to become a social monarchy. In that case I would passionately bear its banner, and the constitutional theories would be quickly enough thrown into the lumber room".

Relations with Bismarck 

On 11 May 1863, Otto von Bismarck, Minister President of Prussia, wrote a letter to Lassalle. This letter was delivered and the two met face to face within 48 hours. This was the first of several such meetings, during which Bismarck and Lassalle freely exchanged views on matters of common concern. This Bismarck-Lassalle correspondence was not made public until 1927 and was therefore not mentioned by earlier biographers.

In September 1878, Bismarck was pressed by Social Democratic representative August Bebel in the Reichstag to provide details about his past relationship with Lassalle, prompting the Chancellor to make the following statement:

Bernstein noted that it is highly unlikely that Bismarck was telling the truth about their relation.

Political ideas 
Owing to his premature death by a duel at age 39, just two years after his serious entry into German radical politics, Lassalle's actual contributions to socialist theory are modest. He was remembered by Richard T. Ely, one of the earliest serious scholars of international socialism, as a popularizer of the ideas of others rather than an innovator:

State 
In contrast with Marx and his adherents, Lassalle rejected the idea that the state was a class-based power structure with the function of preserving existing class relations and destined to wither away in a future classless society. Instead, Lassalle considered the state as an independent entity, an instrument of justice essential for the achievement of the socialist program.

Iron law of wages 
Lassalle accepted the idea first posited by the classical economist David Ricardo that wage rates in the long term tended towards the minimum level necessary to sustain the life of the worker and to provide for his reproduction. In accord with the law of rent, Lassalle coined his own iron law of wages. Lassalle argued that individual measures of self-help by wage workers were destined to failure and that only producers' cooperatives established with the financial aid of the state would make economic improvement of the workers' lives possible. From this, it followed that the political action of the workers to capture the power of the state was paramount and the organization of trade unions to struggle for ephemeral wage improvements is more or less a diversion from the primary struggle.

Philosophy 
Lassalle considered Johann Gottlieb Fichte as "one of the mightiest thinkers of all peoples and ages", praising Fichte's Addresses to the German Nation in a May 1862 speech as "one of the mightiest monuments of fame which our people possesses, and which, in depth and power, far surpass everything of this sort which has been handed down to us from the literature of all time and peoples".

Works

German editions 
 Die Philosophie Herakleitos des Dunklen von Ephesos (The Philosophy of Heraclitus the Obscure of Ephesus) Berlin: Franz Duncker, 1858.
 Der italienische Krieg und die Aufgabe Preussens: eine Stimme aus der Demokratie (The Italian War and the Tasks of Prussia: A Voice of Democracy). Berlin: Franz Duncker, 1859.
 Das System der erworbenen Rechte (The System of Acquired Rights). Two volumes. Leipzig: 1861.
 Über Verfassungswesen: zwei Vorträge und ein offenes Sendschreiben (On Constitutional Systems: Two Lectures and an Open Letter). Berlin: 1862.
 Offenes Antwortschreiben an das Zentralkomitee zur Berufung eines Allgemeinen Deutschen Arbeiter-Kongresses zu Leipzig (Open Letter Answering the Central Committee on the Convening of a General German Workers' Congress in Leipzig). Zürich: Meyer and Zeller, 1863.
 Zur Arbeiterfrage: Lassalle's Rede bei der am 16. April in Leipzig abgehaltenen Arbeiterversammlung nebst Briefen der Herren Professoren Wuttke und Dr. Lothar Bucher. (On the Labor Problem: Lassalle's Speech on the 16th of April [1863] at a Leipzig Workers' Meeting, Together with the Letters of Professor Wuttke and Dr. Lothar Bucher). Leipzig: 1863.
 Herr Bastiat-Schulze von Delitzsch, der ökonomische Julian, oder Kapital und Arbeit (Mr. Bastiat-Schulze von Delitzsch, the Economic Julian, or, Capital and Labour). Berlin: Reinhold Schlingmann, 1864.
 Reden und Schriften (Speeches and Writings). In three volumes. New York: Wolff and Höhne, n.d. [1883].
 Gesammelte Reden und Schriften (Collected Speeches and Writings). In 12 volumes. Berlin: P. Cassirer, 1919–1920.
vol. 1 | vol. 2 | vol. 3 | vol. 4 | vol. 5 | vol. 6 | vol. 7 | vol. 8 | vol. 9 | vol. 10 | vol. 11 | vol. 12

English translations 
 The Working Man's Programme: An Address. Edward Peters, trans. London: The Modern Press, 1884.
 What is Capital? F. Keddell, trans. New York: New York Labor News Co., 1900.
 Lassalle's Open Letter to the National Labor Association of Germany. John Ehmann and Fred Bader, trans. New York: International Library Publishing, 1901. Originally published in US in 1879.
 Franz von Sickingen: A Tragedy in Five Acts. Daniel DeLeon, trans. New York: New York Labor News, 1904.
 Voices of Revolt, Volume 3: Speeches of Ferdinand Lassalle with a Biographical Sketch. Introduction by Jakob Altmaier. New York: International Publishers, 1927.

See also 
 Friedrich Engels, German contemporary who explicitly references Lassalle in his preface to the 1890 German edition of The Communist Manifesto
 General German Workers' Association
 International Workingmen's Association
 Iron law of wages
 Lassallism
 Critique of the Gotha Programme
 Night-watchman state
 Pierre-Joseph Proudhon, French contemporary anarchist theorist

Notes

References 
 .
 .
 .
 .

Further reading 
 Eduard Bernstein, Ferdinand Lassalle as a Social Reformer. Eleanor Marx Aveling, trans. London: Swan Sonnenschein, 1893.
 William Harbutt Dawson, German Socialism and Ferdinand Lassalle. London: Swan Sonnenschein, 1891.
 David Footman, The Primrose Path: A Biography of Ferdinand Lassalle. London: Cresset Press, 1946.
 Arno Schirokauer, Lassalle: The Power of Illusion and the Illusion of Power. Eden and Cedar Paul, trans. London: George Allen and Unwin, 1931.

External links 

 
 

 
1825 births
1864 deaths
Deaths by firearm in Switzerland
Duelling fatalities
European democratic socialists
General German Workers' Association politicians
German social democrats
Jewish German politicians
Jewish socialists
Lawyers from Wrocław
People from the Province of Silesia
People of the Revolutions of 1848
Political party founders
Politicians from Wrocław